Lake Ukiel (or Krzywe Lake - informal name) is a lake in Poland which is located on Pojezierze Olsztyńskie, in the northwest part of Olsztyn, between district Dajtki, Gutkowo and Likusy.
 Lake's volume: 43 611,5 tys. m³
 Degree of purity: II (2004)
 Category of susceptibility to degradation: II (2004)

Ukiel is the biggest lake in Olsztyn. There are pensions, hotels and a municipal beach.

External links
Gallery of photos
Lake Ukiel in tourist guide www.jezioro.com.pl

Ukiel
Olsztyn
Ukiel